Emina Bektas and Sanaz Marand were the defending champions, but both players chose not to participate.

Alexa Guarachi and Erin Routliffe won the title after defeating Sofia Kenin and Jamie Loeb 6–4, 2–6, [11–9] in the final.

Seeds

Draw

Draw

References
Main Draw

Hardee's Pro Classic - Doubles
Hardee's Pro Classic